Danielle Vega, also known under the pen names of Danielle Rollins, Ellie Rollins, and Danielle Valentine, is an American author.

In 2014 it was announced that film rights to Vega's book The Merciless had been purchased by Lionsgate Films and that Pretty Little Liars producer I. Marlene King would serve as scriptwriter and producer.

Bibliography

As Danielle Rollins
Burning (2016)
Breaking (2017)
Dark Stars trilogy
Stolen Time (2019)

As Ellie Rollins
Zip (2012)
Snap (2013)

As Danielle Vega
The Merciless series
The Merciless (2014)
The Merciless II: The Exorcism of Sofia Flores (2016)
The Merciless III: Origins of Evil (2017)
The Merciless IV: Last Rites (2018)
Standalone
Survive the Night (2015)

As Danielle Valentine
How to Survive Your Murder (2022)

References

External links

 

American women novelists
American children's writers
American horror novelists
Year of birth missing (living people)
Living people
21st-century American women